May Blossom Boley (May 29, 1881 – January 7, 1963) was an American actress known for her role as Whale Oil Rosie in Moby Dick (1930).

Stage
Besides being an actress, Boley was a dancer. An article in an 1898 issue of a newspaper commented on "the grace with which she accomplished a difficult solo dance". In 1900, she was a member of the Alice Nielsen Opera Company. Her last stage appearance in New York was in the musical Jubilee. As a singer in the musical Hit the Deck (1927), Boley introduced the popular song "Hallelujah".

Film
Boley starred in The Great Pie Mystery (1931) with Harry Gribbon, Alma Bennett, Harry Myers, Dick Stewart, George Gray and Julia Griffith; Hail, the Princess (1930) with Monte Collins and Alma Bennett; Beneath the Law (1929) with Bobby Clark and Paul McCullough; and Richard Carle in "The Warrior" (1928) with James Sullivan. She also starred in The Women (1939), and Dangerous Curves (1929) as Mrs Spinelli.

Ethan Mordden, in his book Sing for Your Supper: The Broadway Musical in the 1930s'', wrote that Boley resembled Elsa Maxwell.

Personal life
On August 2, 1901, in New York City, Boley married Lieutenant Frederick Lindsley Nicholson, a British Army officer from Putney Hill, London, England.

Death
On January 7, 1963, Boley died in Hollywood Presbyterian Hospital following a long illness. She was 81.

Filmography

References

Bibliography

External links
 
 May Boley(New York Public Library, Billy Rose collection)
  portrait(University of Washington, Sayre collection)
May Boley photo gallery(NY Public Library)
May Boley(Aveleyman)

1881 births
1963 deaths
American silent film actresses
20th-century American actresses
Actresses from Washington, D.C.
19th-century American dancers
20th-century American dancers
Dancers from Washington, D.C.
American female dancers
19th-century American women